La Almunia de San Lorenzo or Almunia de San Lorenzo is a locality located in the municipality of Tolva, in Huesca province, Aragon, Spain. As of 2020, it has a population of 1.

Geography 
La Almunia de San Lorenzo is located 110km east of Huesca.

References

Populated places in the Province of Huesca